The Perth Amboy Pacers were a minor league baseball team based in Perth Amboy, New Jersey. In 1914, the Pacers played as members of the Class D level Atlantic League, placing 5th in the standings in their only season of play.

History
Minor league baseball play began in Perth Amboy, New Jersey in 1914. The Perth Amboy Pacers began play after joining the eight–team Class D level Atlantic League. The league had been known as the New York–New Jersey League a season earlier. The Atlantic League president was Rosslyn M. Cox, who would later serve as the mayor of Middletown, New York. The league began play in May 1914, and concluded the season with Perth Amboy as a member on September 7, 1914.

The Bloomfield-Long Branch Cubans, Danbury Hatters, Middletown Middies, Newark Cubans, Newburgh Hill Climbers, Paterson Silk Citys and Poughkeepsie Honey Bugs teams joined Perth Amboy in beginning Atlantic League play on May 20, 1914.
 
The Perth Amboy Pacers ended the 1914 season in 5th place. The Pacers ended the Atlantic League season with an overall record of 44–49, playing under managers Bob Ganley and Henry Ramsey. On August 25, 1914, the local newspaper reported the Pacers were in 6th place with a 34–45 record and had just defeated Middletown on the road 7–2, with an upcoming game at 5th place Newburgh. The Pacers finished the season 19.0 games behind the 1st place Poughkeepsie Honey Bugs in the final standings. Poughkeepsie finished in 1st place with a record of 65–31, followed by the Newark Cubans/Long Branch Cubans (59–32), Middletown Middies (47–45), Danbury Hatters (49–48), Perth Amboy Pacers (44–49), Newburgh Hill Climbers (40–48), Paterson Silk Citys (32–54) and Bloomfield-Long Branch Cubans/Asbury Park Sea Urchins (30–59) in the final standings. The league had no playoff system and folded after the 1914 season.

Perth Amboy, New Jersey has not hosted another minor league team.

The ballpark
The name and location of the Perth Amboy home minor league ballpark in 1914 is not directly referenced.

Year–by–year record

Notable alumni
Bob Ganley (1914, MGR)
Charlie Meara (1914)

See also
Perth Amboy Pacers players

References

External links
Baseball Reference

Defunct minor league baseball teams
Baseball teams established in 1914
Baseball teams disestablished in 1914
Defunct baseball teams in New Jersey
1914 disestablishments in New Jersey
Perth Amboy, New Jersey
Defunct Atlantic League teams